This is a list of Russian federal districts by GDP measures counted in PPP or Nominal. The  Central Federal District, North Caucasian Federal District, Northwestern Federal District, Southern Federal District and the Volga Federal District are counted for the European part of Russia, while the Far Eastern Federal District, Siberian Federal District and Ural Federal District are counted for the Asian part of Russia.

See also
 List of Russian federal subjects by GRP

References

Russia, GDP
Political divisions of Russia
GDP
Gross state product
GDP